Gilbert C. Fite (May 14, 1918 – July 13, 2010) was an American historian best known for his numerous works on American agricultural history. Fite's lengthy catalog included works that focused heavily on how farmers affected the political environment and broader American economy, both of which examined the political power that farmers wielded in various eras. Fite was a professor at the University of Oklahoma, held the Richard B. Russell Chair in American History at the University of Georgia, and was president of Eastern Illinois University from 1971 to 1976.

Biography

Early life and education 
Born on May 14, 1918, to a couple of poor homesteaders, Fite spent his childhood and teenage years in western South Dakota. He graduated from a Free Methodist secondary school in Wessington Springs, South Dakota, and attended junior college in the area. By 1937, Fite attended Seattle Pacific College until medical issues forced him to attend an institution closer to his family's farm. He enrolled in the University of South Dakota at Vermillion, SD, and graduated with his master's degree in 1941. In the spring of 1945, Fite earned his Ph.D. in history from the University of Missouri.

Academic career 
In 1945, Fite began teaching at the University of Oklahoma alongside other prominent historians such as Edward Everett Dale and Carl Rister. During his early years at the institution, Fite published numerous articles and monographs, including the first carving records and major study done on the Mount Rushmore National Monument. Fite spent 26 years at the University of Oklahoma as an instructor and a researcher until he took over the position of college president at Eastern Illinois University. Fite was president of the institution until 1976, at which time he took the Richard B. Russell Chair in American History at the University of Georgia. While at Georgia, Fite authored more monographs on agricultural history, including Cotton Fields No More: Southern Agriculture, 1865-1980, which won the Theodore Saluoutos Award for the best book in agricultural history in 1985. Fite retired from teaching in 1986 but continued to research and write on agricultural history.

In addition to his teaching and research, Fite held numerous leadership positions in various historical societies. He was president of the Agricultural History Society from 1960-1961, of the Southern Historical Association in 1974, of the Western History Association from 1985-1986, and of Phi Alpha Theta from 1981-1983.

Family 
In 1939, while in a hospital in Mitchell, SD hospital, Fite met Alberta June Goodwin. The two married on July 24, 1941, and later had two sons: Jack and Jim.

Death and legacy 
Fite died on July 13, 2010, in Fort Myers, Florida. In 1990, Fite entered the South Dakota Hall of Fame. Due to his influence in the shaping of American agricultural history, the Agricultural History Society created an annual award in 2000 named after Fite for the best dissertation on agricultural history in honor of him.

Writings 

In total, Fite authored, co-authored, or edited over eighteen monograph-length works and fifty articles.

Political figures 
His first work, an expansion of his doctoral thesis, was an investigation into how Peter Norbeck, a South Dakota politician, helped secure federal support for agricultural programs and the Mount Rushmore National Monument. In 1991, Fite completed a biography of Richard B. Russell, a prominent Georgia politician for whom the chair that Fite occupied at the University of Georgia was named.

Agricultural history 
Fite's greatest impact to American historiography came in the field of agricultural history. Most of his historical analyses focused on either farming impacted the direction of the United States or how farmers and farming communities responded to larger societal changes in American life. The most prominent of these works are The Farmers' Frontier, 1865-1900, American Farmers: The New Minority, and Cotton Fields No More: Southern Agriculture, 1865-1980.

Fite's The Farmers' Frontier, 1865-1900 focused on the development of the Great Plains region during the latter part of the 19th century. In the work, Fite rebuked the environmental determinism set up in Walter Prescott Webb's The Great Plains and instead argued that it was the people- farmers in this instance- that shaped the culture of the Great Plains environment rather than the other way around. Fite's work was one of the first to bring ideas of historical agency to those who chose to live in the Great Plains while also explaining how agriculture became the dominant economic engine of the region due to decisions made by these early American settlers.

The two other influential works of Fite in regard to American agricultural history were American Farmers: The New Minority and Cotton Fields No More: Southern Agriculture, 1865-1980. Both works focused heavily on how the political and economic power of agricultural peoples shrank in the nineteenth and twentieth century. In the former work, Fite argued that those who made their livelihoods on agriculture held less power at the end of the twentieth century than in the early decades of the century due to increased farm consolidation and greater technological innovations, which put more money into the pockets of a select few who were fortunate or smart enough to keep expanding. Additionally, this new economic environment coupled with political changes and a decline in the cultural myth of Jeffersonian agrarianism to shift political attention away from farmers and farming political organizations. Cotton Fields No More continued this sort of analysis, shifting the focus to the southern United States after the Civil War and argued in a similar vein that political and technological changes caused small-scale farmers to leave agriculture. Cotton Fields No More won the 1985 Theodore Saloutos Award for Best Book in Agricultural History.

Notable works (in chronological order)
 Fite, Gilbert C. Peter Norbeck; Prairie Statesman. Columbia: University of Missouri Press, 1948.
Fite, Gilbert C. Mount Rushmore. Norman: University of Oklahoma Press, 1952.
Fite, Gilbert C. George N. Peek and the Fight for Farm Parity. Norman: University of Oklahoma Press, 1954
Haystad, Lee and Gilbert C. Fite. The Agricultural Regions of the United States. Norman: University of Oklahoma Press, 1963.
Fite, Gilbert C. The Farmers’ Frontier. 1865-1900. Albuquerque: University of New Mexico Press, 1977.
Fite, Gilbert C. American Farmers: The New Minority. Bloomington: Indiana University Press, 1981.
Fite, Gilbert C. Cotton Fields No More: Southern Agriculture, 1865-1980. Lexington: University Press of Kentucky, 1984.
Fite, Gilbert C. and Jim E. Reese. An Economic History of the United States. Boston: Houghton Mifflin, 1973.
Fite, Gilbert C. Richard B. Russell, Jr.: Senator from Georgia. Chapel Hill: University of North Carolina Press, 1991.

References

External links
 

20th-century American historians
American male non-fiction writers
Historians of agriculture
1918 births
2010 deaths
University of South Dakota alumni
University of Missouri alumni
University of Oklahoma faculty
University of Georgia faculty
Presidents of Eastern Illinois University
Historians from Ohio
Historians from South Dakota
20th-century American male writers